Statistics of Turkish First Football League in season 1987–88.

Overview
Twenty clubs participated, and Galatasaray S.K. won the championship. Denizlispor, Kocaelispor, Gençlerbirliği and Zonguldakspor were relegated to Second League.

This was  the first season where clubs were awarded 3 points for victories, in contrast to previous years where a victory had earned the winning club only 2 points.

League table

Results

References
Turkey - List of final tables (RSSSF)

Süper Lig seasons
1987–88 in Turkish football
Turkey